Sofie is a 1992 Danish drama film based on the novel Mendel Philipsen and Son by Henri Nathansen. It was Denmark's submission for the 1992 Academy Award for Best Foreign Film.

Cast 
 Karen-Lise Mynster - Sofie
 Ghita Nørby - Frederikke
 Erland Josephson - Sofie's Father
 Jesper Christensen - Hojby
 Torben Zeller - Jonas
 Henning Moritzen - Frederick Philipson

See also
 List of submissions to the 65th Academy Awards for Best Foreign Language Film
 List of Danish submissions for the Academy Award for Best Foreign Language Film

References

External links 

Entry in danskefilm

1992 films
1992 drama films
Films directed by Liv Ullmann
1992 directorial debut films
Danish drama films
1990s Danish-language films